Seldon Hunt (born 1969, in Melbourne and migrated to New York in 2006, (now residing in Brooklyn) is an artist best known for his photography and his graphic artwork (on album covers and promotional poster) for rock musicians.

Hunt's photography usually consists of thick undergrowth yet is often devoid of any human presence. His work has been compared to the romantic landscape painting of the 19th Century. His influences include the works of Vaughan Oliver and Neville Brody.

Hunt is best known in the world of music for his graphic works – often extremely complex – for rock bands Neurosis, Earth, Jesu, Isis, Dälek, Mick Harris, Acid Mothers Temple, and the Melvins. His first album cover artwork was for a solo album by KK Null (Zeni Geva). As a photographer who's obsessed with a vacuumesque conception of landscape, he has regularly working with Stephen O'Malley from Sunn O)))) and the label Southern Lord. His work is also associated with many other labels such as Hydrahead, Ipecac, TeePee and Relapse Records.

As a writer, he is the author of the cosmic essay published in the booklet of Sunn O)))’s The Grimmrobe Demos.

Seldon Hunt's already cult iconography for the current metal and experimental scenes, is gradually moving on from the visual world of music to contemporary art. Following in the footsteps of artists like Raymond Pettibon his work is now finding a path into the fine art world.

Seldon Hunt is part of a new generation of artists who feel attuned to a desire for their work to move away from the city/urban and the inherent tumult resulting from the self-destruction of a consumer society.
His subject matter is found in the forgotten urban parklands late at night where he endlessly walks patches of preserved nature close to the extremely urban environment where he lives.

Selected exhibitions

Solo exhibitions
2014 Howl Gallery in Florida, USA 
2013 Howl Gallery in Florida, USA 
2011 Amplifest in Portugal 
 2009 "Six Degrees of Transmutation" – Baum Gallery in University of Central Arkansas, USA 
2008 The Centre for Creative Communications in Toronto, Canada
2008 The Effenaar – Netherlands
2008 Mechanikal Insektrospective – Cultuurcentrum Luchtbal in Belgium

Group exhibitions
2017 Infinite Darkness – The Lodge Gallery in New York City, USA 
2016 The Devils Reign – Stephen Romano Gallery in New York City, USA 
2015 Realms of the Unreal – Gristle Galleryin New York City, USA 
2015 Ars Necronomica – Providence Art Club in Rhode Island, USA
2014 The Elusive Key – Gristle Gallery in New York City, USA 
2013 Altars of Madness – Casino Luxembourg – Forum d’art contemporain in Luxembourg
2013 Tiny Trifecta – Cotton Candy Machine in New York City, USA
2012 Dark Signs – Zahzo Gallery in New York City, USA
2011  Shirts and Destroy – Cotton Candy Machine in New York City, USA
2010 Exquisite Corpse – Gasser Grunet in New York City, USA 
2009 Galerie du Jour Agnes B in Paris, France
2008 "Catalyst" – FIFTY24SF gallery in San Francisco, USA
2006 Seldon Hunt/Stephen O'Malley – AB Gallery in Brussels
2006 Little Rippers Outre Gallery in Melbourne, Australia

Filmography
 "Within the Drone" (Biographic documentary about Dylan Carlson) contained with Hibernaculum by Earth

Bibliography
 Khanate – "Things Viral"
 Sunn O))) "Grimmrobe Demos" 2005
 Sunn O))) "Black"
 Stephen Kasner – monograph
 Whitehorse
 Moss (UK)

References

External links
 Seldon Hunt Official website
 Seldon Hunt at Saatchi Gallery
 Galerie du Jour – Agnès b
 Images on Google of Seldon Hunt's graphic works
 Work by Seldon Hunt at Arthur Magazine

Living people
1969 births